The 2021–22 MFA Elite Division was the 109th season of the MFA Elite Division, the top-tier football league in Mumbai, a city in the Indian state of Maharashtra. The 2020–21 season was called off due to the COVID-19 pandemic. The league format was restructured in 2018-19 season and two groups were formed. In 2021, the groups were renamed the MFA Elite Premier League and MFA Elite Corporate League.

Aaditya Thackeray was re-elected president of the Mumbai Football Association.

Mumbai City FC is considered Mumbai's premier club, having participated in the 2021–22 Indian Super League season and the 2022 AFC Champions League, while Kenkre FC was Mumbai's representative at the 2021–22 I-League. However, Mumbai City hasn't competed in the MFA Elite League since 2019 when their U-18 team were suspended for assaulting the assistant referee.

Karnataka Sports Association were the champions of the 2019–20 MFA Elite Division.

Format 
The MFA Elite Division consists of two parallel leagues, the MFA Elite Premier League and the MFA Elite Corporate League. This season, the Elite Premier League has 18 teams while the Elite Corporate League has 14. Only the teams from the MFA Elite Premier League are considered for promotion to the I-League 2nd Division.

In the League stage, teams from their respective leagues play each other once. The teams finishing at the top of their respective league are crowned winners. 

The winners and the next two teams from each league qualify for the Harwood Champions League where they will play each other once in a joint league. The leaders will be declared the champions. This tournament is expected to run from the 27th June to 11th July at the Cooperage Ground, Mumbai.

Stadiums
Matches were played at the Cooperage Ground in  Nariman Point, Neville D’Souza Football Turf in Bandra, and Mumbai Football Arena in Andheri.

Teams

League table

Elite Premier League

Elite Corporate League 
</onlyinclude>

Harwood Champions League 

</onlyinclude>

See also
 2018–19 MDFA Elite Division
 2021–22 season in state football leagues of India
 2022–23 I-League 2nd Division

References 

2021–22 in Indian football leagues